(Our Homeland Tatarstan) is the main Tatar language newspaper, published in Kazan.

At first, the daily paper did not contain pictures and used the İske imlâ Arabic-based orthography, switching in 1920 to the Yaña imlâ orthography when it became  (Tatarstan News). In February 2022, it changed names to become .

Throughout its history, Vatanym Tatarstan focused on the social, political, and cultural issues in Tatarstan, and many influential Tatar journalists worked at the paper over the years, including Fatix Ämirxan, Musa Cälil, Äxmät İsxaq, and Ğäliäsğar Kamal. By 1970, its circulation had reached 175,000. 

In 2010, the paper was redesigned with a more modern font and a greater emphasis on photographs. It generally distributed as a four-page A2 size paper and on Fridays as a 20-page A3 size paper. In 2019, Sabirova Gölnara was named editor-in-chief of the paper, the first woman to hold that title.

Previous names:
1918–1920:  /  (Labour)
1920–1922:  /  (Tatarstan News)
1922–1924:  /  (Tatarstan)
1924–1951:  /  /  (Red Tatarstan)
1951–1960:  (Soviet Tatarstan)
1960–1992:  (Socialist Tatarstan)
1992–now:  (My Homeland Tatarstan)

Newspapers published in Russia
Newspapers published in the Soviet Union
Tatar-language newspapers
Kazan

References

External links
 Эш (1919) — Mirasxanä Center for Written and Musical Heritage 
 Татарстан хәбәрләре (1920) — Mirasxanä Center for Written and Musical Heritage 
 Qzьl Tatarstan (1924 to 1931) — Mirasxanä Center for Written and Musical Heritage